James Edward "Red" Bird (April 25, 1890 – March 23, 1972) was a pitcher in Major League Baseball. He pitched for the Washington Senators in one game.

Bird was reportedly discovered by Senators owner Clark Griffith pitching in the Texas League for the Shreveport Gassers. He pitched in his only Major League game on September 17, 1921, against the Cleveland Indians at Griffith Stadium. He entered the game in relief of Frank Woodward and allowed three earned runs over five innings pitched.

References

External links

1890 births
1972 deaths
Major League Baseball pitchers
Washington Senators (1901–1960) players
Baseball players from Texas
People from Stephenville, Texas
Nashville Vols players